= Barli Na =

Place in Islamabad, Pakistan

- Location within Pakistan
- Coordinates: 33.15°N 73.18°E
- Country: Pakistan
- Province: (Islamabad Capital Territory) Islamabad C.T
- Elevation: 452 m (1,483 ft)
- Time zone: UTC+5 (PST)

Barli Na is a town in the Islamabad Capital Territory of Pakistan. It is located at 33°15′35″N 73°18′0″E with an altitude of 452 metres (1,486 feet).
